The Missing is a 2003 American Western film directed by Ron Howard and starring Tommy Lee Jones and Cate Blanchett. It is based on Thomas Eidson's 1996 novel The Last Ride. The film is set in 1885 New Mexico Territory and is notable for the authentic use of the Apache language by various actors, some of whom spent long hours studying it. The film was produced by Revolution Studios, Imagine Entertainment, and Daniel Ostroff Productions and distributed by Columbia Pictures (Sony Pictures Releasing).

Plot
In late 19th-century New Mexico, Samuel Jones arrives at the house of his adult daughter Magdalena "Maggie" Gilkeson, hoping to reconcile with her after abandoning her and her mother decades before. She is unable to forgive him, feeling he caused her mother's early death, and turns him away the next morning. Renegade Apache Pesh-Chidin, alias El Brujo and followers raid the area, killing settlers and taking young women and girls to sell into sex slavery in Mexico. Among those abducted is Maggie's eldest daughter, Lilly. Maggie's rancher boyfriend Brake Baldwin was among the settlers killed. Maggie secures her father's release from jail, and the two decide to go after the abducted girls, taking the youngest daughter Dot with them. The sheriff is unwilling to spare men for the mission.

The party encounter some U.S. Cavalry soldiers at another ranch that was attacked by El Brujo. These men suspect Jones as having led the raiders, but Maggie eases the situation. The lieutenant in charge evades helping them, as he must lead his unit to carry out the forced relocation of captive Native Americans. Maggie, her father, and her younger daughter Dot are the only ones tracking El Brujo and his warriors.

After the three fail to ambush the raiders, they are rescued by Kayitah, a Chiricahua friend of Jones. Kayitah and his son Honesco are also tracking El Brujo because Honesco's fiancee is among the captives. Kayitah and Honesco agree to join Maggie and her family. Kayitah tells her that her father had traveled for some time with his Chiricahua band, who called him Chaa-duu-ba-its-iidan.

Together the two families find and free the women captives. Lilly accidentally alerts the bandits, resulting in the death of Kayitah. The survivors steal El Brujo's horses and flee to the mountains. The Mexican gang arrives to buy the women, and the kidnappers murder them and steal their horses to chase the fleeing women. Jones leads the group to a bluff he knows, with a strong defensive position. The kidnappers can only attack up a steep, narrow path. During a standoff, Jones tries to explain to Maggie why he abandoned the family, saying that Chaa-duu-ba-its-iidan means "shit for luck". Maggie says she does not forgive him.

The group fights off an attack by the remaining kidnappers. Jones and Maggie hold off the attackers, but El Brujo stealthily climbs up the side of the cliff and injures Honesco, while his followers use fire arrows to spread panic in the camp. Maggie heads into the camp to fight El Brujo, but he ambushes her. Jones lights bushes on fire to slow down the attackers, and confronts El Brujo, who had kidnapped his granddaughter. Despite being stabbed, El Brujo gains the upper hand and tries to kill Maggie. Jones intervenes, and he and El Brujo fall off a cliff to their deaths. Maggie shoots at the last remaining kidnappers to scare them off.

Maggie returns home with her father's body, her daughters, Honesco, and the other kidnapped girls.

Cast

Reception
The Missing earned mixed reviews from critics. On Rotten Tomatoes, a review aggregator, the film has an approval rating of 58% based on 174 reviews; the average rating is 6.10/10. The website's critical consensus reads, "An expertly acted and directed Western. But like other Ron Howard features, the movie is hardly subtle." On Metacritic, the film has a score of 55 out of 100 based on 40 critics, indicating "mixed or average reviews". Audiences polled by CinemaScore gave the film an average grade of "B" on an A+ to F scale. Philip French of The Observer referred to the film as Howard's "finest film to date," and Michael Wilmington of the Chicago Tribune called it the "best and toughest western since Unforgiven."

The Missing was well received among Native American populations within the United States. Many praised its use of Apache dialect, saying that it was so well spoken it could be understood by most Chiricahua-speaking adults. Actors such as Tommy Lee Jones, Jay Tavare, Simon R. Baker, and others had learned to speak some dialogue in the Chiricahua dialect of Apache; this was used throughout the film. Tavare has noted that only about 300 people are considered fluent speakers of Chiricahua today. Following screenings of the film, Native American students said that it stimulated pride among them because of its authenticity.

The Missing grossed $27 million domestically and $11.4 million internationally for a worldwide total of $38.4 million.

References

External links
 
 
 
 
 
 

2003 films
2000s adventure films
2003 thriller drama films
2003 Western (genre) films
American adventure drama films
American thriller drama films
American Western (genre) films
Columbia Pictures films
Films scored by James Horner
Films about child abduction in the United States
Films about death
Films about families
Films based on American novels
Films based on Western (genre) novels
Films set in New Mexico
Films set in the 1880s
Films shot in New Mexico
Films directed by Ron Howard
Films produced by Brian Grazer
Imagine Entertainment films
Revolution Studios films
2000s Spanish-language films
Apache-language films
2003 drama films
2000s English-language films
2000s American films